A Woman and a Girl Driving is an oil on canvas painting by American Impressionist Mary Cassatt, created in 1881. It depicts the artist's sister Lydia alongside Odile Fèvre, the niece of Edgar Degas, in a carriage traveling through the Bois de Boulogne. Scholars have seen the painting as a representation of growing female autonomy in the Parisian public sphere, where driving one's own carriage signified independence. The painting is held at the Philadelphia Museum of Art.

References

Paintings by Mary Cassatt
1881 paintings
Paintings in the collection of the Philadelphia Museum of Art